Hebrus may refer to:
 the Latin name of the Maritsa river in Bulgaria and Greece
 the Latin name of the Devoll river in present-day Albania
 Hebrus (bug), a genus of water bugs
 the Hebrus Valles, an outflow channel system on Mars